Nijefurd is a former municipality in the northern Netherlands, in the province of Friesland.

History
It was formed in 1984 from the old municipalities of Hindeloopen, Stavoren, and Workum, and part of Hemelumer Oldeferd.

In 2011, it formed together with the municipalities of Bolsward, Sneek, Wûnseradiel and Wymbritseradiel the new municipality Súdwest Fryslân.

Population centres 

 Hemelum
 Hindeloopen
 It Heidenskip
 Koudum
 Molkwerum
 Nijhuizum
 Stavoren
 Warns
 Workum.

External links 

Official Website

States and territories established in 1984
Municipalities of the Netherlands disestablished in 2011
Former municipalities of Friesland
Súdwest-Fryslân